Flavivirga algicola is a bacterium from the genus of Flavivirga which has been isolated from a red alga from the coast of Weihai.

References 

Flavobacteria
Bacteria described in 2021